The Colesville–Ashton Line, designated Route Z2, is a weekday peak-hour bus route operated by the Washington Metropolitan Area Transit Authority between Olney (Spartan Rd & Georgia Ave) and Silver Spring station of the Red Line of the Washington Metro. The line operates every 30–35 minutes during the weekday peak hours only. Route Z2 trips are roughly 60–70 minutes long.

Background
Route Z2 operates during the weekday peak-hours only between Silver Spring station and Olney via  MedStar Montgomery Medical Center, Ashton, Colesville, and White Oak. The route mainly operates along Colesville Road and New Hampshire Avenue providing service within those neighborhoods.

Route Z2 currently operates out of Montgomery division.

History
Route Z2 originally operated Silver Spring-Wheaton Line under the Capital Transit Company. The line originally operated between Silver Spring and Wheaton. The line was transfer to buses in the 1940s but was later discontinued.

The Colesville–Ashton Line was originally operated under route Z1 which operates as Streetcars. The line was later formed by buses in June 1956, renamed route Z2, and acquired by DC Transit. The line was later acquired by WMATA on February 4, 1973.

Routes Z2 operated alongside the Z1, Z3, and Z4 as the Colesville Line. Route Z2 operated between Silver Spring and Olney with select trips ending in Cloverly.

1978 Changes
On February 19, 1978, route Z2 alongside the Z1, Z3, and Z4 were extended to Silver Spring station after the station opened on February 6, 1978.

Simplification of Line
Through the 1980s to 1990s, routes Z1, Z3, and Z4 were separated from the Colesville Line and formed into different routes. Routes Z1 and Z4 were formed into the Glenmont–Silver Spring Line to operate between Silver Spring station and Glenmont station. Route Z3 and Z5 will operate between Silver Spring and Burtonsville Park and Ride. Route Z2 will remain under the Colesville Line being extended to Olney.

Saturday Ride On Service
In September 1993, Ride On took over Saturday service for the Z2, under the Colesville – Silver Spring Line. The reason was for WMATA to reduce costs and apply buses to more higher ridership routes.

2004 Changes
After a series of proposals in April 2004, route Z2 was rerouted to serve Briggs Chaney Road, Good Hope Road and Cape May Road instead of operating directly via New Hampshire Avenue replacing Z3. Weekday midday and Saturday Z2 trips will only operate between Silver Spring station and Colesville. Route Z2 would be renamed the Colesville–Ashton Line as a result of the changes.

2007 Changes
On June 24, 2007, route Z2 was rerouted to remain on New Hampshire Avenue between Briggs Chaney and Cape May roads. Service along Good Hope and Cape May roads will be discontinued and replaced by Ride On route 39.

2009 Changes
On June 28, 2009, most off-peak service for route Z2 was discontinued due to low ridership. Weekday peak-hour service and Saturday service still operate.

2012 Proposed Changes
In 2012, WMATA proposed to eliminate all Saturday Z2 service and on the four federal holidays on which a Saturday schedule is operated. This was due to unduplicated segment of Saturday Z2 (between Bonifant Road / Good Hope Road and Randolph Road) that serves very few passengers and most of Saturday Z2 is served by another route with capacity to accommodate current Z2 riders. Alternative service will be provided by routes C8 and Z8.

2013 Changes
In December 2012, WMATA announced that all weekend Z2 trips operated by Ride On will be eliminated on January 12, 2013 due to low ridership. Alternative service would be provided by routes C8 and Z8.

2015 Changes
When the Paul S. Sarbanes Transit Center at Silver Spring station opened, route Z2 was rerouted from its bus stop along Wayne Avenue to Bus Bay 113 at the transit center on the first level sharing the bay with route Z6.

Proposed Elimination
In 2019, WMATA proposed to eliminate all route Z2 service as it will overlap the upcoming Ride On Flash BRT service along U.S. Route 29 that is slanted to open in 2020 plus other services. Overall average of 25 riders per weekday trip according to WMATA.

Controversy
Montgomery County expressed concerns over the proposed changes. According to Council Vice President Tom Hucker, residents impact 65,000 residents of the Maryland county. Residents urged WMATA to not cut service as it will cause a lack of transportation towards the residents.

At least 30 Montgomery County leaders called on WMATA not to cut Metrobus routes in the region, saying it will "disproportionately affect" students, seniors, and service workers with no other source of transportation. The letter's signatories include state senators Craig Zucker, Susan Lee, and Cheryl Kagan, Maryland State Delegates Marc Korman, Sara Love, and Julie Palakovich Carr and all nine members of the county council. In a letter to Metro Chairman Paul Smedberg, members of the Montgomery County Council and state delegation said they opposed the cuts, which are part of WMATA's proposed FY 2021 operating budget, and urged the agency to prioritize "maintaining frequent and reliable service." They also quote;

The Metrobus routes currently recommended for service reductions, including the Q, J, L and Z bus lines, provide transportation for many of our most transit-dependent residents," the lawmakers wrote. "Service reductions will disproportionately affect students commuting to Montgomery College, seniors running daily errands and service workers accessing jobs. Roughly 65,000 Montgomery riders use Metrobus on a daily basis, and for many these bus routes are their only source of transportation.

The 35 lawmakers ended the letter by saying cuts to Metrobus service for Montgomery County would counter their "regional goals of reducing traffic congestion and greenhouse gas emissions."

On April 2, 2020, WMATA backed off from the proposal due to customer opposition.

References

Z2